The  is an electric multiple unit (EMU) train type operated by the private railway operator Kobe Electric Railway (Shintetsu) in Japan since May 2016.

Design
The trains were built by Kawasaki Heavy Industries in Kobe. Based on the earlier 6000 series trains also built by Kawasaki Heavy Industries, they have stainless steel bodies with three pairs of sliding doors per side.

Formation
The trains are formed as three-car sets as follows, with two motored driving ("Mc") cars sandwiching a non-powered trailer ("T") intermediate car.

The two motored cars each have one PT7162-A single-arm pantograph.

Interior
Passenger accommodation consists of longitudinal bench seating. LCD passenger information screens above the doorways provides information in four languages: Japanese, English, Chinese, and Korean. Each car includes a wheelchair space.

History
Details of the new order were announced in June 2015. The first set, 6501, entered service on 21 May 2016.

Fleet/build details
The individual build histories for the fleet are as follows.

References

External links

 Kobe Electric Railway press release 

Electric multiple units of Japan
Transport in Kobe
Train-related introductions in 2016
1500 V DC multiple units of Japan
Kawasaki multiple units